Daniel Finěk (born 25 May 2000) is a Czech professional football defender currently playing for FK Varnsdorf on loan from FC Hradec Králové in the Czech National Football League.

Club career 

He made his league debut in Hradec's Czech National Football League 1–0 win at Táborsko on 22 July 2018.

References

External links 
 Daniel Finěk official international statistics
 
 Daniel Finěk profile on the FC Hradec Králové official website

Czech footballers
Czech Republic youth international footballers
2000 births
Living people
Czech National Football League players
FC Hradec Králové players
FK Varnsdorf players
Association football defenders